The 2013–14 Belgian Cup (also known as Cofidis Cup for sponsorship purposes) was the 59th season of the main knockout football competition in Belgium. It commenced on 26 July 2013 with the first matches of Round 1 and ended on 22 March 2014. The winners qualified for the play-off round of the 2014–15 UEFA Europa League and the 2014 Belgian Super Cup. Genk were the defending champions, but they did not retain their title as they were eliminated at the quarter-final by Oostende.

Lokeren won the trophy after beating Zulte Waregem 1-0 in the final on 22 March 2014.

Competition format
The competition consists of ten rounds. The first seven rounds are held as single-match elimination rounds. When tied after 90 minutes in the first three rounds, penalties are taken immediately. In rounds four to seven, when tied after 90 minutes first an extra time period of 30 minutes are played, then penalties are taken if still necessary. The quarter- and semifinals will be played over two legs, where the team winning on aggregate advances. The final will be played as a single match.

Teams enter the competition in different rounds, based upon their 2012–13 league affiliation. Teams from the fourth-level Promotion or lower began in Round 1. Third Division teams entered in Round 3, with Second Division teams joining in the following round. Teams from the Belgian First Division enter in Round 6.

First round
These round of matches were played on 26, 27 & 28 July 2013.

On top of these fixtures, 8 teams received a bye to the second round, namely Torpedo Hasselt (6), Belgica Edegem (6), Wilrijk (6), Assesse (6), Spy (5), Couvin-Mariembourg (4), Gouy (6) and Wellin (5).

Second round
These round of matches were played on 3 & 4 August 2013.

Third round
These round of matches are to be played on 10 & 11 August 2013.

Fourth round
These round of matches were played on 17 & 18 August 2013.

Fifth round
These round of matches were played on 24 & 25 August 2013.

Final Stages

Bracket

Round 6
The draw for round 6 was made on 28 August 2013 and the matches took place on 25 September 2013. The 16 teams from the Belgian Pro League entered at this stage, and each will play one of the 16 winners from the previous round.

Round 7
The draw for round 7 was made on 28 August 2013 and the matches took place on 4 December 2013.

Quarterfinals
The draw for the quarterfinals took place together with the draw for rounds 6 and 7 on 25 September 2013. The matches will be played over two legs on 18 December 2013 (leg 1) and 15 January 2014 (leg 2).

First legs

Second legs

Semifinals
The matches will be played over two legs on 27 & 28 January 2014 (leg 1) and 5 February 2014 (leg 2).

First legs

Second legs

Final

See also
 2013–14 Belgian Pro League

References

External links
  

Belgian Cup seasons
Cup
Belgian Cup